Monolith is a 2022 Australian sci-fi/thriller film released on 27 October 2022. It stars Lily Sullivan, the only on-screen actor in the film, as a journalist uncovering a mystery. Described as high-concept science fiction, the film is written by Lucy Campbell, directed by Matt Vesely, and produced by Bettina Hamilton.

Plot
"A disgraced journalist... turns to podcasting to salvage her career, before uncovering a strange artefact that she believes is evidence of an alien conspiracy".

Cast
 Lily Sullivan as The Interviewer
 Erik Thomson as Dad (voice)
 Kate Box as Laura (voice)
Terence Crawford as Klaus (voice)
 Damon Herriman (voice)
 Ling Cooper Tang as Floramae (voice)
 Ansuya Nathan as Paula (voice)
 Matt Crook as Scott (voice)
 Rashidi Edward as John (voice)
 Brigid Zengeni as Shiloh (voice)
 Belle Kalendra-Harding

Production
Monolith is the first feature film to be produced as part of a joint initiative called "Film Lab: New Voices", by South Australian Film Corporation (SAFC) and the Adelaide Film Festival (AFF). A development lab ran for 11 months, in which three teams (chosen for development out of an initial 63 contenders) developed their scripts, and one was chosen for production at this time. Monolith received an initial  in funding from SAFC and AFF, and with Mercury CX also helping to fund the film.

Lucy Campbell wrote the script; it is directed by Matt Vesely (development manager at Closer Productions) and produced by Bettina Hamilton. The cinematographer is Michael Tessari and Tania Nehme edited the film.

Filming took place in the Adelaide Hills from late May 2022. It is described as a high-concept science fiction thriller. It is all shot on one location, and there is just one on-screen actor (Lily Sullivan); various actors' voices speak to her on the telephone. These include  Damon Herriman,  Erik Thomson, and  Kate Box.

Release and reception
Monolith had its Australian premiere at the Adelaide Film Festival on 27 October 2022.

In January 2023 it was announced that the film would have its official world premiere at the SXSW Film Festival in March 2023. It has also secured North American and international sales, with distribution to be handled by XYZ Films for North America and Blue Finch Films in the UK. Todd Brown, head of international acquisitions at XYZ, said, about director Matt Veseley, "We haven't been more excited about a filmmaker since we first came across Aaron Moorhead and Justin Benson with their debut feature Resolution (released 2013). Bonsai Films had already signed on to distribute Monolith in Australian and New Zealand cinemas.

After its screening at the Adelaide Film Festival, Rachael Mead of InDaily wrote: "Sullivan is superb as the ethically dubious journalist, effortlessly holding the focus of the entire film", and "Vesely’s feature is far more than a clever manipulation of constraint to heighten tension... Beneath the thrilling claustrophobia lies a cunning puncturing of privilege and a clear-eyed critique of the way we construct, manipulate and ultimately consume 'truth' in a globalised world".

References

External links

2022 films
2022 independent films
2022 science fiction films
Australian science fiction thriller films
Australian independent films
Films set in South Australia
Films shot in Adelaide
2020s English-language films
Australian mystery thriller films
One-character films